Carabus melancholicus costatus is a species of beetle in the family Carabidae that can be found in France, Portugal, and Spain. They are brownish-black coloured.

References

melancholicus costatus
Beetles described in 1824